Ark 2 is the only studio album by the short lived British rock band Flaming Youth. It was released in October 1969 by Fontana Records, and was written and produced by the songwriting team of Ken Howard and Alan Blaikley. Its concept, inspired by the media attention to the 1969 moon landing, tells the story of man's evacuation from a burning Earth and its journey into space. Each member of the band sings a lead vocal.

The lead single from the album was "From Now On".

Overview
The original British pressing excludes Howard and Blaikley's names in the liner notes, but they are included in the US pressing.

The band premiered the album with a performance at the London Planetarium. They performed a five-song set for the Dutch television broadcaster TROS, broadcast on 14 May 1970. The set included: "Earthglow", "Weightless", "Changes", "Space Child", and "From Now On (Immortal Invisible)". Both the music and vocals were mimed, and it remains is the only known footage of Flaming Youth to exist.

The album has since been reissued several times, mainly by reason of it being drummer Phil Collins' first major label recording. After the band split in early 1970, Collins went on to join the rock band Genesis.

Critical reception
The album received some critical praise in the music press. Melody Maker listed the album as "Pop Album of the Month", calling it "adult music beautifully played with nice tight harmonies". Disc and Music Echo said "there is some splendid music on this very good first album". The rock press of the time was even more favourable and it was awarded Sunday Times Rock Album of the Year in 1969.

Despite the positive critical reaction, the album and single were not commercially successful and did not chart.

Track listing

1996 reissue

Personnel
Flaming Youth
 (Flash) Gordon Smith – vocals, guitar, 12-string guitar, bass
 Ronnie Caryl – vocals, 12-string guitar, bass
 Brian Chatton – vocals, organ, piano
 Phil Collins – vocals, drums, percussion

Production
 John Constable – stained glass montage photo
 Gered Mankowitz – photography
 Barry Ainsworth – recording
 Howard Blaikley – writer

References

External links 
 The unofficial Flaming Youth - Ark 2 website
 Ronnie Caryl Official Biography

Flaming Youth (band) albums
1969 albums
Concept albums
Uni Records albums